Star Wars trilogy can refer to several Star Wars film trilogies or related works:

Film trilogies
Star Wars original trilogy, released from 1977–1983
Star Wars prequel trilogy, released from 1999–2005
Star Wars sequel trilogy, released from 2015–2019

Video games
 Star Wars Trilogy (pinball) (1997)
 Star Wars Trilogy Arcade (1998)
 Star Wars Trilogy: Apprentice of the Force (2004) – for GameBoy Advance

See also 

 Star Wars in other media